Little River is a town on Banks Peninsula in the Canterbury region of New Zealand.

Location

Little River is approximately 30 minutes drive from Akaroa, a tourist destination on Banks Peninsula, and 45 minutes drive from Christchurch. It is on State Highway 75, which links Christchurch and Akaroa.

The road from Christchurch is at sea level but once past Little River, the road rises steeply to the top of the summit road. From the summit at Hilltop, all of the bays on the peninsula are accessible on equally steep roads. Not all roads are sealed and some are more suited to four wheel drive vehicles.

Rail Trail
The Little River Rail Trail is a cycling and walking track that opened in 2006, which largely follows the course of the old Little River Branch railway that ran to Little River from its junction with the Southbridge Branch in Lincoln.  This branch line was opened to Little River on 11 March 1886, closed to passengers on 14 April 1951, and closed to all traffic on 30 June 1962. Between 1927 and 1934, Little River railway passengers were served by the experimental and popular Edison battery-electric railcar, the only one of its type to be built.

History

The population early last century numbered in the thousands, and people were mainly employed in timber milling and farming. A fairly localised but major industry was the harvesting and threshing of cocksfoot.

Today the population of the area is approximately one thousand people, with people moving into the area seeking a more country / rural lifestyle.

Churches

St John the Evangelist 

St John The Evangelist church  is a Catholic church located in Little River. It was built around 1924. It is a category two historic place. It suffered earthquake damage and was closed in 2022.

St Andrews 

St Andrews Anglican church is located at 32 Upper Church St. The first Anglican services were held in 1866 in Little River. St Andrews was built in a gothic style and opened in 1879. It was designed by architect Benjamin Mountfort and opened by Bishop Harper. Sir Miles Warren designed the lounge which was added to the eastern end of the church in 1990. The church is a category two historic place.

Demographics
It is part of the Banks Peninsula South SA2 statistical area.

Little River

Little River had a population of 279 at the 2018 New Zealand census, unchanged since the 2013 census, and an increase of 51 people (22.4%) since the 2006 census. There were 114 households. There were 135 males and 144 females, giving a sex ratio of 0.94 males per female, with 72 people (25.8%) aged under 15 years, 21 (7.5%) aged 15 to 29, 162 (58.1%) aged 30 to 64, and 24 (8.6%) aged 65 or older.

Ethnicities were 93.5% European/Pākehā, 14.0% Māori, 1.1% Asian, and 2.2% other ethnicities (totals add to more than 100% since people could identify with multiple ethnicities).

Although some people objected to giving their religion, 54.8% had no religion, 32.3% were Christian and 5.4% had other religions.

Of those at least 15 years old, 57 (27.5%) people had a bachelor or higher degree, and 27 (13.0%) people had no formal qualifications. The employment status of those at least 15 was that 108 (52.2%) people were employed full-time, 48 (23.2%) were part-time, and 6 (2.9%) were unemployed.

Banks Peninsula South

Banks Peninsula South had a population of 1,167 at the 2018 New Zealand census, an increase of 66 people (6.0%) since the 2013 census, and an increase of 141 people (13.7%) since the 2006 census. There were 498 households. There were 585 males and 585 females, giving a sex ratio of 1.0 males per female. The median age was 48.2 years (compared with 37.4 years nationally), with 213 people (18.3%) aged under 15 years, 132 (11.3%) aged 15 to 29, 654 (56.0%) aged 30 to 64, and 171 (14.7%) aged 65 or older.

Ethnicities were 93.3% European/Pākehā, 10.0% Māori, 1.0% Pacific peoples, 2.1% Asian, and 2.3% other ethnicities (totals add to more than 100% since people could identify with multiple ethnicities).

The proportion of people born overseas was 20.8%, compared with 27.1% nationally.

Although some people objected to giving their religion, 54.2% had no religion, 31.6% were Christian, 0.3% were Buddhist and 4.1% had other religions.

Of those at least 15 years old, 237 (24.8%) people had a bachelor or higher degree, and 141 (14.8%) people had no formal qualifications. The median income was $31,500, compared with $31,800 nationally. The employment status of those at least 15 was that 513 (53.8%) people were employed full-time, 171 (17.9%) were part-time, and 15 (1.6%) were unemployed.

Agricultural and Pastoral Show

Every year in January the Little River Agricultural and Pastoral Show is held in the Awa-Iti Domain situated in the middle of the town. This attracts many visitors as well as exhibitors and competitors in the equestrian arena and the numerous displays of sheep, cattle, dog trialling, produce, floral and cooking.

Waterways

Little River nestles in a deep valley and myriads of streams and springs converge to form the Okana and Okuti Rivers. The combined waters form the Takiritawai River, a short stream which flows into the eastern end of Lake Wairewa / Lake Forsyth. The lake, rivers and streams abound in trout, perch (redfin) and eel. The world record for the largest brown trout caught was held by one of these rivers in the 1960s.

On 19 October 2011, the Okana River caused the worst flooding in Little River for many years, with State Highway 75 closed. Long term residents believe that the flooding was the worst since the "Wahine storm" on 10 April 1968.

Education
Little River School is a full primary school catering for years 1 to 8.

Little River has had three schools; the first opened in 1873, and was replaced in 1880. That was destroyed by fire in 1939. The current school opened in 1942.

Notable residents 
Alana Bremner New Zealand rugby player

Chelsea Bremner New Zealand rugby player

References

External links 

 Photo of cyclists outside Little River Hotel, 1885

Banks Peninsula
Populated places in Canterbury, New Zealand